Mariastern Abbey may refer to:
Mariastern Abbey, Banja Luka, Trappist abbey in Bosnia and Herzegovina.
Mariastern Abbey, Hohenweiler, Cistercian nunnery in Austria.